Parfait Bitee (born 23 July 1985) is a Cameroonian basketball player with the University of Rhode Island. In 2006–07, Bitee became the starting point guard and primary ball-handler for the squad. Bitee also played on the Cameroonian men's national basketball team that won the silver medal at the FIBA Africa Championship 2007.

Bitee is a nephew of Petro Atlético head coach Lazare Adingono. Bitee has played for Petro Atlético at the Angolan major league BAI Basket for the 2012-13 season.

External links
 Profile cstv.com
 Statistics at Rhode Island espn.com
 Chat with Rhode Island G Parfait Bitee espn.com

1985 births
Living people
Atlético Petróleos de Luanda basketball players
Cameroonian expatriate basketball people in the United States
Cameroonian men's basketball players
JL Bourg-en-Bresse players
Leuven Bears players
AS Salé (basketball) players
Point guards
Rhode Island Rams men's basketball players
Basketball players from Yaoundé
Western High School (Louisville, Kentucky) alumni